Kočani is a municipality in the eastern part of North Macedonia. Kočani is also the name of the town where the municipal seat is found. The municipality is part of the Eastern Statistical Region.

Geography
The municipality borders Kriva Palanka Municipality to the north, Kratovo Municipality and Probištip Municipality to the west, Makedonska Kamenica Municipality and Vinica Municipality to the east, and Češinovo-Obleševo Municipality and Zrnovci Municipality to the south.

History
By the 2003 territorial division of the Republic, the rural Orizari Municipality was attached to Kočani Municipality.

Demographics
There are 31,602 residents of Kočani Municipality, according to the 2021 census. Ethnic groups in the Kočani municipality:

Settlements

References

External links

Official website

 
Municipalities of North Macedonia
Eastern Statistical Region